Triadokoenenia is a monotypic genus of Prokoeneniid microwhip scorpions, first described by Bruno Condé in 1991. Its single species, Triadokoenenia millotorum is distributed in Madagascar.

References 

Palpigradi
Arthropods of Madagascar
Monotypic arachnid genera
Taxa named by Bruno Condé